Sciurotamias is a genus of rodent in the family Sciuridae, found in China. It contains the following species:
 Père David's rock squirrel (Sciurotamias davidianus)
 Forrest's rock squirrel (Sciurotamias forresti)

References 

 
Rodent genera
Taxa named by Gerrit Smith Miller Jr.
Taxonomy articles created by Polbot